Ron is a shortening of the name Ronald.

Ron or RON may also refer to:

Arts and media

Big Ron (EastEnders), a TV character
Ron (King of Fighters), a video game character
Ron Douglas, the protagonist in Lucky Stiff played by Joe Alasky
Ron Weasley, a character in Harry Potter.

Language
 Ron language, spoken in Plat State, Nigeria
 Romanian language (ISO 639-3 code ron)

People

Mononym
Ron (singer), Rosalino Cellamare (born 1953), Italian singer

Given name
Ron (given name)

Surname
Dana Ron (born 1964), Israeli computer scientist and professor
Elaine Ron (1943-2010), American epidemiologist
Emri Ron (born 1936), Israeli politician 
Ivo Ron (born 1967), Ecuadorian football player
Jason De Ron (born 1973), Australian musician
José Ron (born 1981), Mexican actor
Liat Ron, actress, dancer and dance instructor 

Lior Ron (born 1982), Israeli-American film and trailer composer and musician
Michael Ron (born 1932), Israeli fencer
Michael Røn (born 1984), Danish-born Norwegian footballer
Moshe Ron (1925-2001), Israeli materials scientist
Pan Ron, Cambodian singer and songwriter
Ron Ron or Ronald White, American rapper and director
Yuval Ron, Israeli musician

Places 
Ron, Karnataka, a city in India
Røn, a village in Vestre Slidre, Norway
Ron (river, Vietnam)

Science and technology
 Gyrodyne RON Rotorcycle, mid-1950s US helicopter
 Remote online notarization, electronic notarization online
 Research Octane Number, a standard measure of the performance of a fuel
 Resilient Overlay Network, an Internet application architecture

Other uses
 Cyclone Ron, a 1998 cyclone in the South Pacific
 Rhongomiant, or Ron, King Arthur's lance
 Romanian leu (ISO 4217 code: RON), the currency of Romania
"Ron's Piece", a track from the 1986 Jean-Michel Jarre album Rendez-Vous
 Rum, ron in Spanish
 Re-open Nominations, a "none of the above" ballot option
 Rota Osobogo Naznacheniya, a 1940s unit of Russian commando frogmen

See also

Big Ron (disambiguation)
Ronn (disambiguation)